Jesús Soto Karass (born October 15, 1982) is a Mexican former professional boxer who competed from 2001 to 2018. who has challenged once for the WBA interim welterweight title in 2013. His older brother is José Luis Soto Karass, also a professional boxer.

Professional career

Soto Karass holds wins over Michel Rosales, Saúl Román, Carson Jones, Vince Phillips, David Estrada, and Andre Berto. He is signed to Bob Arum's Top Rank.  His fight with Gabriel Martínez was ruled a No Contest after an unintentional headbutt.

Soto Karass vs. Jones I, II
Jesús lost to Mike Jones on the undercard of Margarito vs. Pacquiao in Arlington, Texas on November 13, 2010. This fight was a huge controversy after the fight when the decision was ruled in favor of Mike Jones after a hard fought battle which saw Mike Jones become exhausted after the second round due to an attempt at finishing the fight. A rematch for this fight happened on February 19, 2011, with Karass losing a convincing fight holding his side.

Professional boxing record

Exhibition boxing record

Big Knockout Boxing record

See also
Notable boxing families

References

External links

Sportspeople from Los Mochis
Boxers from Sinaloa
Welterweight boxers
1982 births
Living people
Mexican male boxers
Light-middleweight boxers